The Scots PGC College is an independent, co-educational, Uniting Church, day and boarding school, located in Warwick, Queensland, Australia. 
The College currently caters for approximately 450 international and Australian students from Prep to year 12, including 180 boarders.

Located on two campuses, the College is currently divided into three age-based 'Learning Precincts' - a Junior School, a Middle School and a Senior School. In 2008, a new Performing Arts Center was opened to cater specifically for Drama and Music.

The Scots PGC College is a member of the Junior School Heads Association of Australia and The Associated Schools.

History
The Presbyterian Girls' College and The Scots College were established as boarding schools for girls and boys in 1918 and 1919 respectively, by Messrs. B. T. DeConlay, R. J. Shilliday, and W. R. Black, to serve the needs of the large Scottish population in the area and provide a solid Presbyterian education.

The two separate schools were amalgamated in 1970, and this new co-educational school was named The Scots PGC College. Scots PGC became a school of the Uniting Church in 1977, following Church union.

1995 saw the College Council move to adopt a new school badge designed by Neil Bonnell (Principal from 1985 to 1994), and a new school motto, "Always Aiming Higher". Prior to this the badges and mottos of both the original schools were used. The mottos were "Semper Petens Alta" ("Always Aiming Higher") for the boys, and "E Labore Dulcedo" ("Sweetness Out of Labour") for the girls.

In 2018 student Dolly Everett committed suicide rather than return to the school and endure more bullying, leading to calls for a national anti-bullying campaign. Many former students were recorded as saying that bullying at the school had been endemic since the 1980s.

Uniform
The Clan Cameron of Erracht Tartan is the basis of the College uniform.

Boarding houses
The boy boarders are divided into two boarding houses:
Cunningham House 
Hawkins House

Girls' boarding is located at the Locke St Campus.

House system
The school's house system is based on four different clans:
Cameron - Red
Leslie - Purple
Macinnes - Gold
Mackay - Green

Sporting competitions within the College are conducted in inter-clan (inter-house) format, in the three core sports of swimming, cross-country running and athletics. The inter-clan competition is also conducted in the majority of team sports played at the College.

Pipe band
In line with its Scottish heritage, the College has a pipe band.

Students may join the Pipe Band from the age of 9, with lessons available for interested students from year 3 onwards. The bands compete at various Highland Gatherings in the South-East corner of Queensland, as well as at State and National Championships.

The College Pipes and Drums had the privilege and honour of providing musical support for the ANZAC Day Dawn Service at Villers-Bretonneux, France in 2013, in addition to other ANZAC Commemorations across Europe.

In 2002, the Scots PGC Pipe Band opened the Australia versus Scotland rugby union test match at Ballymore, and in May 2003 and 2007 opened the Polocrosse World Cup at Morgan Park.

Notable alumni
Emily Bass - Broncos NRLW player
Laura Geitz - captain Australian Diamonds Netball team and Queensland Firebirds team
Benjamin Rigby - Australian actor

See also
List of schools in Queensland
List of boarding schools
Education in Australia
List of pipe bands

References

External links

Educational institutions established in 1918
Presbyterian schools in Australia
Boarding schools in Queensland
Private schools in Queensland
High schools in Queensland
Junior School Heads Association of Australia Member Schools
Uniting Church schools in Australia
Warwick, Queensland
Schools on the Darling Downs
1918 establishments in Australia